Platyarthrus aiasensis is a species of woodlouse in the family Platyarthridae. It is found in Africa, the Caribbean, Europe and Northern Asia (excluding China), North America, and temperate Asia.

References

Isopoda
Articles created by Qbugbot
Crustaceans described in 1954